This is a list of the burgraves of Meissen.

The Burgraviate of Meissen was first mentioned in 1068, when King Henry IV installed a burgrave in the imperial castle (Reichsburg) of Meissen. The burgraves of Meissen were royal officials appointed to document the king's claims to power. They acted as a counterbalance to the margrave and bishop of Meissen and were based at a castle on the site of the Albrechtsburg at Meißen. The lordship of the burgrave included quite a few of the villages in the surrounding area. The Vogtland was not part of the burgraviate, but the two territories had the same lord. The burgraves came from the House of Meinheringer and, from 1426, the House of Plauen. 
The Burgraviate of Meissen should not be confused with the Bishopric of Meissen and the Margraviate of Meissen.

List (incomplete) 

With the extinction of the Older Line of the advocates (Vögte) of Plauen in 1572 the family line of the burgraves of Meißen ended. After the Plauens had never reigned as burgraves, the title now went to the prince-electors of Saxony.

Coat of arms 
The coat of arms of the burgraves had a black saltire on a gold field. On the helmet is a gold rectangular shield board (Schirmbrett), on which is a cross, which is adorned at the corners with 5 peacock feathers. The mantle is gold and black. This coat of arms was also carried by the burgraves of Merseburg, Naumburg (Saale), Neuenburg near Freyburg (Unstrut) and Osterfeld.

Literature 
 J.C.Hasche: Versuch einer Geschichte derer Burggrafen zu Meissen, oder Diplomatische Annalen derselben, in: Magazin der sächsischen Geschichte, 1784–1791, 6th part, 1789, pages 4 – 23
 Traugott Märcker: Das Burggrafthum Meissen, in: Diplomatisch kritische Beiträge zur Geschichte und dem Staatsrechte von Sachsen, 1 vol., Leipzig, 1842
 Otto Posse: Die Markgrafen von Meissen und das Haus Wettin: bis zu Konrad dem Grossen, Leipzig, 1881
 "Elisabeth von Meißen", in: Bau- und Kunstdenkmäler Sachsens, 1919, S. 273 und Fig. 361
 Helmut Gröger: Tausend Jahre Meißen, Meißen, 1929
 Günter Naumann: Meißner Geschichte in Daten 929-1993, Meißen, 1993
 Hans-Jürgen Pohl: Geschichten und Sagen des Meißner Landes, Parts I to IV, Meißen, 1996 ff
 Hans-Jürgen Pohl: Das Burggrafschloss zu Meissen - Bauwerke des Burggrafenhofes einst und heute, Meissen, 2000, 
 Helga Wäß: "Burggrafschaft Meißen" in: "Form und Wahrnehmung mitteldeutscher Gedächtnisskulptur im 14. Jahrhundert. Ein Beitrag zu mittelalterlichen Grabmonumenten, Epitaphen und Kuriosa in Sachsen, Sachsen-Anhalt, Thüringen, Nord-Hessen, Ost-Westfalen und Südniedersachsen" (Bd. 1), "Katalog ausgewählter Objekte vom Hohen Mittelalter bis zum Anfang des 15. Jahrhunderts" (Bd 2), Bristol u.a. 2006, see Vol. 2: pp. 403–428. - 

Burgraves of Meissen
Meissen
!Burgraves of Meissen